José Maurer (6 May 1906 – 23 May 1968) was an Israeli-Argentine actor. He was regarded as one of the greatest figures in Yiddish theatre.

Early life
He was born Yoshe Maurer Neumann in the town of Boryslav, then a thriving Oil town in Galicia, Austro-Hungarian Empire. Maurer was the son of the local cobbler, and known as an amateur violinist, actor and singer.

Career
When the famous Vilnius Jewish Theatre (Vilna Troupe), under the direction of Zygmund Turkow visited Boryslav in 1922, the 16-year-old Yoshe was offered a minor role. Two weeks later, as the Theatre left, so did Yoshe, never to return to his home town. As a member of this famous Yiddish Theatre he toured Poland and Romania until 1927, when he emigrated to Argentina.

In Buenos Aires he became one of the leading actors in the Jewish Yiddish Theatre, playing along such renowned actors as Joseph Buloff, Maurice Schwartz and Jacob Ben-Ami. He was regarded as a first class "character" (drama) actor and as a "tour de force" used to change leading roles, for example, playing with Ben Ami both parts of Man and Devil in Got, Mentsch Und Taivel, the famous Yiddish version of Faust by Jacob Gordin, night after night. On the other hand, he had a gift for comedy and took part in many musical comedies.

In the late nineteen-forties, he was elected President of the Jewish Actors Guild in Argentina and served in this post for more than 20 years, until his emigration to Israel.

He was a notable co-star in 28 Argentine films, specializing in "foreign" accents and played the Spanish Argentine stage, among others, with Berta Singerman.

In 1963, he moved to Israel where he played the Yiddish stage and was elected there too as President of the Yiddish Actor's Guild until his death.

Death and legacy
His lifelong wish was to die on stage and this he did. In 1968, shortly after the curtain went down, and still wearing makeup on his face, he had a stroke and died shortly afterwards, aged 62.

His collection of manuscript plays, including translations into Yiddish of modern Argentine drama, was donated to the Bar Ilan University and is now part of the Rena Costa Center for Yiddish Studies.

Filmography
 24 horas en la vida de una mujer (1944)
 Apasionadamente (1944)
 La Verdadera victoria (1944)
 Madame Sans-Gêne (1945)
 Albéniz (1947)
 A sangre fría (1947) (a.k.a. In Cold Blood)
 María de los Ángeles (1948)
 Tierra del fuego (1948)
 Captura recomendada (1950)
 Piantadino (1950)
 Vivir un instante (1951) (a.k.a. Julia)
 The Path to Crime (1951)
Suburb (1951)
 Payaso (1952) (a.k.a. The Clown)
 El Amor nunca muere (1955) (a.k.a. Love Never Dies)
 Pecadora (1955)
 Oro bajo (1956)
 Que me toquen las golondrinas (1957) (a.k.a. La Despedida)
 Angustia de un secreto (1959)
 El Dinero de Dios (1959)
 La Procesión (1960)
 Héroes de hoy (1960)
 Yo quiero vivir contigo (1960) (a.k.a. Ich möchte mit Dir leben (West Germany))
 Quinto año nacional (1961)
 Detrás de la mentira (1962)
 Mate Cosido (1962)
 Las Ratas (1963) (a.k.a. The Rats)
 Alias Flequillo (1963) (a.k.a. La Pantera del Gatillo)

External links
 

1906 births
1968 deaths
People from Boryslav
Ukrainian Jews
Israeli male stage actors
Israeli male film actors
Argentine male stage actors
Argentine male film actors
Polish emigrants to Argentina
Argentine emigrants to Israel
Argentine people of Austrian-Jewish descent
Argentine people of Polish-Jewish descent
Israeli people of Austrian-Jewish descent
Austro-Hungarian Jews
Jews from Galicia (Eastern Europe)
People from the Kingdom of Galicia and Lodomeria
Argentine Ashkenazi Jews
Israeli Ashkenazi Jews
People from Buenos Aires
Israeli people of Argentine-Jewish descent
Israeli people of Polish-Jewish descent
20th-century Israeli male actors